William Francis Karren is an American musician, best known as the lead guitarist of the punk/riot grrrl band Bikini Kill, formed by Kathleen Hanna, with Karren, Tobi Vail and Kathi Wilcox. He was also active in many other music projects, including the Go Team, the Frumpies, Corrections, and Spray Painted Love (with Tobi Vail). He did not participate in Bikini Kill's 2019 reunion; his replacement was Erica Dawn Lyle.

In a Bikini Kill interview, Karren gave his influences as The Slits, The Ronettes, Chrissie Hynde, and Wire.

References

Riot grrrl musicians
American punk rock guitarists
American indie rock musicians
American feminists
Feminist musicians
Male feminists
Kill Rock Stars
K Records artists
Place of birth missing (living people)
Living people
Year of birth missing (living people)
American male guitarists
Bikini Kill members
The Frumpies members